Thangavel or Thangavelu is a Tamil male given name. Due to the Tamil tradition of using patronymic surnames it may also be a surname for males and females.

Notable people

Given name
 A. L. Thangavel, Indian politician
 Mariyappan Thangavelu, Indian Paralympic high jumper
 K. A. Thangavelu, Indian film actor
 N. Thangavel, Indian politician
 K. Thangavel, Indian politician
 M. Thangavel, Indian politician
 S. Thangavelu, Indian politician

Surname
 Thangavelu Asokan, Indian engineer

See also

Tamil masculine given names